Parotis marinata is a moth in the family Crambidae. It was described by Johan Christian Fabricius in 1784. It is found in India (Assam, Darjeeling), Sri Lanka, New Guinea, on the Solomon Islands, the Democratic Republic of the Congo (Orientale, Equateur), South Africa (Eastern Cape). and Australia.

The larvae feed on Rauvolfia vomitoria.

References

Moths described in 1784
Spilomelinae